WWND-LP is a Classic Hits, Classic Top 40, Carolina Beach, and Oldies formatted broadcast radio station.  The station is licensed to White Stone, Virginia and serving White Stone, Irvington, Kilmarnock, and Deltaville on the Northern Neck of Virginia.  WWND-LP is owned and operated by White Stone Radio, Inc.

References

External links
 Windy 103.9 Online
 

2016 establishments in Virginia
Classic hits radio stations in the United States
Oldies radio stations in the United States
Radio stations established in 2016
WND-LP
WND-LP